Josh Barlow (born 15 May 1991) is a former Scotland international rugby league footballer who last played for Halifax and the Swinton Lions.

Background

Barlow was born in Halifax, West Yorkshire, England.

Playing career
Barlow started playing rugby league with amateur side King Cross before joining Wigan at the age of 16. He played in the club's academy sides, but failed to make a first-team appearance. He then moved to Australia, where he played in the Illawarra League where he played for Berkeley Eagles and Collegians clubs, but returned to Britain later that year and joined Huddersfield. In autumn 2010, he signed for hometown club Halifax. Barlow left Halifax at the end of the 2012 season to join Swinton.

International
Barlow is a Scotland international, having made his début in 2011. Although not initially named in their squad for the 2013 Rugby League World Cup, he was later called up as a replacement for the injured Jonathan Walker.

In October and November 2014, Barlow played in the 2014 European Cup competition. He played in all of Scotland's fixtures.

References

External links
Swinton Lions profile

1991 births
Living people
English rugby league players
English people of Scottish descent
Halifax R.L.F.C. players
Rugby league hookers
Rugby league players from Halifax, West Yorkshire
Scotland national rugby league team players
Swinton Lions players